Space Nation is a Finnish/US company that plans to produce a reality TV-show, the winner of which will be sent to space. The competitors will be selected from users of a game app. Space Nation has built up partnerships with companies in the space industry in the US, Europe and China. It is the first space tourism company to join the United Nations World Tourism Organization (UNWTO) as an affiliate member.

Astronaut Training Program 
In April 2018 Space Nation launched a game app for mobile phones, the Space Nation Navigator, which the company calls an astronaut training app. It is developed in partnership with NASA astronaut trainers and includes mini games, quizzes, challenges and a narrative adventure. The app was announced as the first step in the "Space Nation Astronaut Program". Space Nation promises to choose one hundred app users for a real life training camp; twelve of these Candidates will continue to a 10-week astronaut training program. The best performing candidate will become a "Space Nation Astronaut" to get a free trip to space. The company arranged a first "training experience" for social media influencers in May 2018 in North East Iceland in an area where the NASA astronauts trained for the Apollo program before going to the Moon in 1967.

The company did not announce the carrier for the supposed space flight. As of November 2018, all possible carriers have not yet started with regular commercial space tourism.

Crowdfunding campaign 
Under its former name, Cohu Experience Oy, Space Nation had run a successful crowdfunding-campaign in early 2017, which broke Finland's crowdfunding record at that time. The campaign raised more than 3,2 million Euro, the first million of which in only 43 minutes. The company had predicted a profit of 84 million Euro until May 2018, 347 million Euro in 2018–2019, and a 119-fold rise in valuation to 5 billion Euro in 2019.

Media 
Space Nation launched a lifestyle website in October 2017 called Space Nation Orbit. The company had plans for a TV show around the physical training camp to take place in early 2019. Further plans included "Space Nation Experience Parks", the first one potentially being in China.

Space Nation owns "an office" on board the International Space Station (ISS), which is a 50x50x30 cm box. The company is a NASA Space Act Agreement signatory. NASA announced that it has provided free content for the app through a Space Act Agreement.

Financial difficulties 
In August 2018, Space Nation announced it had "encountered financial difficulties" and put the "Space Nation Astronaut Program" on an indefinite hold.

On November 16, 2018, Space Nation's CEO informed investors and crowdfunders, that the company is filing for bankruptcy.

In June 2019 Space Nation announced that the company has been restructured and reestablished in the United States and resumed its activities.

See also 
 MarsOne

References

External links 
 

Companies based in Helsinki
2013 establishments in Finland
Companies established in 2013
Aerospace business development agencies